Michael G. Lenett is an American former politician from Maryland and a member of the Democratic Party. He lost the Democratic primary election for renomination to his Maryland State Senate to sitting Delegate Roger Manno 54% to 46%. Lenett's term expired December 31, 2010. He represented Maryland's district 19 in Montgomery County.

Born in New York City, Lenett received a B.A. from Brandeis University and an M.A. from Georgetown University before attending the Georgetown University Law Center for a J.D. and an LL.M. degree. He was a professor at George Washington University's National Law Center, and worked for the firm Cuneo, Giblert, & LaDuca.

References

External links

Democratic Party Maryland state senators
Living people
Georgetown University alumni
Georgetown University Law Center alumni
1962 births
Politicians from New York City
Brandeis University alumni
21st-century American politicians